A Pinch of Snuff may refer to:

 A Pinch of Snuff (novel), a 1978 novel by Reginald Hill
 A Pinch of Snuff (TV series), a 1994 British television miniseries, based on the novel